Por amar sin ley (English title: Laws of love) is a Mexican telenovela produced by José Alberto Castro that premiered on Las Estrellas on 12 February 2018. It is a remake of a 2016 Colombian telenovela La ley del corazón. The telenovela revolves around the personal life and work of a group of lawyers belonging to a prestigious law firm.

Series overview

Episodes

Season 1 (2018)

Season 2 (2019)

Notes

References 

Lists of Mexican drama television series episodes
Lists of soap opera episodes